Thevalakkara  is a village in the Karunagappally taluk, Kollam district of the state of Kerala, India. Formerly known as Quilon, it is one of the 14 districts of Kerala.Thevalakkara is the land that contains a famous Devi temple and along with mosque and church in the same area. This place is a land of unity.

Situation 
The district has a long coastline, a major Arabian Sea seaport and the inland Ashtamudi Lake while Kollam is also the capital of Kerala's cashew industry. Plains, mountains, lakes, lagoons and backwaters, forests, farmland and rivers make up the topography of the district. The area historically had trading relationships with Phoenicia and Ancient Rome. About 30 percent of the district is covered by Ashtamudi Lake, making it a gateway to the Kerala backwaters. The Thevalakara and Thekkumbagam panchayats established the ancient korekini ("sea pointed inland") port of Tarsish in 1500  BC. The kadappa at Thevalakara is where ship masts (kadappa) were made for centuries.

Culture
The Thevalakkara is a land which is surrounded by water fields and paddy lands, according to the demography on population Hinduism 73%, Muslims 21% and Christians concludes 6%.

Notable Personalities 
Thevalakkara is home to great people like Thevalakkara Kunjanpilla and also his son and famous dramatist Babykuttan Thoolika (Gopinatha Kurup) and famous director Thevalakkara Chellapan and Thevalakkara vaidyans.

References

External links 
 The Symphony Thevalakkara Club in Kollam. https://goo.gl/maps/KtPG9nqfwtv
 Thevalakkara devi temple
 Indilayappan temple
 Thekkanguruvayoor sri krishna temple

Gramadeepam library arts&sports club, Thevalakkara
 https://www.facebook.com/gramadeepamtvk

 Villages in Kollam district